The Gonars concentration camp was one of the several Italian concentration camps and it was established on February 23, 1942, near Gonars, Italy.
Many internees were transferred to this camp from the other Italian concentration camp, Rab concentration camp, which served as equivalent of final solution in Mario Roatta's ethnic cleansing policy against ethnic Slovenes from the Italian-occupied Province of Ljubljana and Croats from Gorski Kotar, in accord with the racist 1920s speech by Benito Mussolini, along with other Italian war crimes committed on the Italian-occupied territories of Yugoslavia:  
 
The first transport of 5,343 internees (1,643 of whom were children) arrived two days after its establishment, on February 23, 1942, from the Province of Ljubljana and from the other two Italian concentration camps, the Rab camp and the camp in Monigo (near Treviso).

The camp was disbanded on September 8, 1943, immediately after the Italian armistice.

Only in 1973 a sacrarium was created by sculptor Miodrag Živković at the town's cemetery. Remains of 453 Slovenian and Croatian victims were transferred into its two underground crypts. It is believed that at least 50 additional persons died in the camp due to starvation and torture.

Notable inmates

Slovenes
Viktor Antolin, professor of philosophy (student/journalist at the time)
France Balantič, poet
France Bučar, lawyer, writer, and statesman in post-1991 Slovenia
Lojze Bukovac, bearer of Commemorative Medal of the Partisans of 1941, a writer
Alojz Gradnik, poet
Bogo Grafenauer, historian
Zora Konjajev, pediatrician
Boris Kraigher, politician
Vasilij Melik, historian
Frane Milčinski (pen name Ježek), a poet, actor, children's writer, and director
Odon Peterka, poet
Jakob Savinšek, sculptor and poet
Bojan Štih, literary critic, essayist, and stage director
Bogdana Stritar, opera singer
Nada Vidmar, opera singer
Nande Vidmar, painter
Anton Vratuša, politician
Aleš Strojnik, scientist and educator
Vitomil Zupan, writer

Sources
 Alessandra Kersevan (2008): Lager italiani. Pulizia etnica e campi di concentramento fascisti per civili jugoslavi 1941–1943. Editore Nutrimenti,
 Alessandra Kersevan (2003): Un campo di concentramento fascista. Gonars 1942–1943., Kappa Vu Edizioni, Udine.
 Nadja Pahor Verri (1996): Oltre il filo : storia del campo di internamento di Gonars, 1941–1943, Arti Grafiche Friulane, Udine.
 Luca Baldissara, Paolo Pezzino (2004): Crimini e memorie di guerra: violenze contro le popolazioni e politiche del ricordo, L'Ancora del Mediterraneo.

Further reading
 Bregar, Ana (2013): Comparing situation at the Gonars Concentration Camp and the Rab Concentration Camp (In Slovene: "Primerjava taboriščnih razmer na Rabu in v Gonarsu"), Diploma thesis, Faculty of Arts, Department of history, University of Ljubljana.
 Megla, Maja (2012): Dr. Peter Starič, inženir elektronike, o svoji novi knjigi, ki izide septembra v angleškem jeziku, Delo.
 Mihajlovič, Nataša (2012): Comparing the Gonars Concentration Camp and the Mauthausen Concentration Camp (In Slovene: "Primerjava koncentracijskih taborišč Gonars in Mauthausen"), Diploma thesis, Faculty of Arts, Department of history, University of Ljubljana.
 Škorjanec, Viljenka (2011): Italijanske metode pri izpustu iz koncentracijskih taborišč, Zveza zgodovinskih društev Slovenije, Ljubljana, Zgodovinski časopis, 1–2, pp 152–171

See also 
 Rab concentration camp
 List of Italian concentration camps

References

External links
Gonars Concentration Camp (EUROM)
An article from Romacivica.net 
A website devoted to the Gonars Memorial  
Aerial view of the two sub-camps (white zones on the left): camp B is the vertical stripe just north of Gonars, camp A is the square zone north-west of the town

1940s in Italy
1942 establishments in Italy
1943 disestablishments in Italy
Italian war crimes
Italian fascist internment camps in Italy